Japan's  are a parliamentary resolution (never adopted into law) that have guided Japanese nuclear policy since their inception in the late 1960s, and reflect general public sentiment and national policy since the end of World War II. The tenets state that Japan shall neither possess nor manufacture nuclear weapons, nor shall it permit their introduction into Japanese territory. The principles were outlined by Prime Minister Eisaku Satō in a speech to the House of Representatives in 1967 amid negotiations over the return of Okinawa from the United States. The Diet formally adopted the principles in 1971.

Overview 
After the atomic bombings of Hiroshima and Nagasaki, Japanese public sentiment grew firmly opposed to the presence of nuclear weapons on Japanese soil, or even in Japanese waters. During Eisaku Satō's first term as Prime Minister, this opposition became a major obstacle to his campaign pledge to end the U.S. occupation of Okinawa, returning the island to Japanese control. The U.S. military was thought to keep nuclear weapons on the island, though it did not confirm or deny such weapons, and Satō faced opposition to reacquisition unless the nuclear presence was removed. As a compromise, Satō appeased the United States by bringing Japan into the Nuclear Non-Proliferation Treaty (NPT) in exchange for a nuclear-free, Japan-controlled Okinawa.

In the years leading up to this agreement, Satō was forced to appease public concerns that his administration might favor a nuclear weapons program; to this end, he introduced the Three Non-Nuclear Principles in a December 11, 1967, address to the Diet. (Actually, the principles of nonproduction, nonpossession, and nonintroduction had been stated by Defense Agency Director-general Kaneshichi Masuda that May.) Satō worried, though, that the principles might produce too great a restraint on Japan's defense. To lessen their restrictive effect on the military, in a speech the following February he placed the principles within the broader framework of his Four-Pillars Nuclear Policy. The pillars, in mimicry of the three pillars of the NPT, were
 To promote the peaceful use of nuclear power,
 To work toward global nuclear disarmament,
 To rely on the extended U.S. nuclear deterrent
 To support the Three Non-Nuclear Principles.
The fourth pillar left room for policy change in the future, calling for Japan to abide by the principles "under the circumstances where Japan's national security is guaranteed by the other three policies".

The Diet passed a resolution formally adopting the principles in 1971, though they were not made law. Eisaku Satō was presented with the Nobel Peace Prize in 1974, in large part for his work toward Japan's entry into the NPT. In his Nobel Lecture (on the seventh anniversary of his original statement to the Diet), Satō reiterated and discussed the Three Non-Nuclear Principles and expressed hope and confidence that future governments would adopt them as well.

Every Prime Minister of Japan since Satō has publicly reaffirmed the Three Non-Nuclear Principles. However, Japanese government-sponsored studies have been carried out in the past—and are suspected by many to be ongoing—to assess the feasibility of developing a nuclear weapons program. In recent years public officials and nuclearization advocates have been unprecedentedly vocal in questioning the principles, but the public remains committed to them.

See also 
 Japan's non-nuclear weapons policy
 Japanese nuclear weapon program
 Nuclear latency
 Nuclear umbrella

References 

 Eisaku Satō's Nobel Lecture, 11 December 1974.
 "Non-nuclear principles to be reviewed". Chūgoku Shimbun Peace News, 2 June 2002.
 Campbell, Kurt M. and Sunohara, Tsuyoshi (2004). "Japan: Thinking the Unthinkable". The Nuclear Tipping Point: Why States Reconsider Their Nuclear Choices Ch. 9: 218–253. 
 Address by Prime Minister Junichiro Koizumi at the Hiroshima Memorial Service, 6 August 2005.

Nuclear weapons policy
Nuclear technology in Japan
Politics of Post-war Japan
Foreign relations of Post-war Japan
Japanese defence policies